The Nambu Line is a Japanese railway line which connects Tachikawa Station in Tachikawa, Tokyo and Kawasaki Station in Kawasaki, Kanagawa. For most of its length, it parallels the Tama River, the natural border between Tokyo and Kanagawa prefectures. It lies along the Tama Hills. It is part of the East Japan Railway Company (JR East) network. The line forms part of what JR East refers to as the "Tokyo Mega Loop" around Tokyo, consisting of the Keiyo Line, Musashino Line, Nambu Line, and the Yokohama Line. The name refers to the southern part of the ancient province of Musashi (now Tokyo and northern Kanagawa prefecture), through which the Nambu Line runs.

Basic data

Operators, distances:
Total: 
Passenger: 
Freight: 
East Japan Railway Company (JR East) (Services and tracks)
Kawasaki – Tachikawa: 
Shitte – Hama-Kawasaki: 
Shitte – Shin-Tsurumi Signal Station – Tsurumi:  (no regular service)
Japan Freight Railway Company (JR Freight) (Services only)
Shitte – Tachikawa: 
Shitte – Hama-Kawasaki: 
Shitte – Shin-Tsurumi Signal Station: 
Stations: 29
Main line: 26
Branch line: 3
Double-tracking: Kawasaki – Tachikawa
Railway signalling: Automatic Block System

Station list

Main line
"Rapid" service trains (two trains per hour between 10 a.m. and 4 p.m) do not stop at Shitte, Yakō, Hirama, Mukaigawara, Tsudayama, Kuji, Shukugawara, Nakanoshima, Yanokuchi, Minami-Tama, Nishifu, Yaho, Yagawa, or Nishi-Kunitachi. All other trains except for some seasonal services are "Local" services, stopping at all stations.

Nambu Branch Line
 All stations are located in Kanagawa Prefecture.
 Trains can pass each other only at Kawasaki-Shinmachi.

Freight branch
The  connects Shitte Station and Shin-Tsurumi Yard on the Tōkaidō Main Line (Hinkaku Line) and the Musashino Line. Freight trains operating between Tokyo Freight Terminal and northern Japan operate on both branch lines.

Rolling stock

 the following fleet of electric multiple unit (EMU) trains is used on Nambu Line services, with all trainsets based at Nakahara Depot.
 205-1000 series 3 x 2-car EMUs (Nambu Branch Line services, since August 2002)
 E233-8000 series 35 x 6-car EMUs (since 4 October 2014)
 E233-8500 series 1 x 6-car EMU (since 15 March 2017)

From 15 March 2017, the last remaining 209 series trainset, set 53, was replaced by a six-car Ome Line and Itsukaichi Line E233-0 series set 670 modified and renumbered to become E233-8500 series set N36.

Future plans 
JR East announced plans in February 2023 to transfer four E127 series cars (two sets) from the Niigata area to Nambu Branch Line services.

Previously used
 72/73 series 4/6-car EMUs (from 1963 until 1978)
 101 series 4/6-car EMUs (from 1969 until January 1991)
 103 series 6-car EMUs (from 1982 until December 2004)
 101 series 2-car EMUs (Nambu Branch line services, until November 2003)
 205-0 series 6-car EMUs from (March 1989 until December 2015)
 205-1200 series 6-car EMUs (from 2004 until January 2016)
 209-0 series 6-car EMUs (from April 1993 until February 2015)
 209-2200 series 6-car EMUs (from 2010 until March 2017)

History
The private Nambu Railway opened the line in five stages between 1927 and 1930 (freight branches are omitted):
 27 March 1927: Kawasaki – Noborito
 1 November 1927: Noborito – Ōmaru (near Minami-Tama)
 11 December 1928: Ōmaru – Bubaigawara (then called Yashikibun)
 11 December 1929: Bubaigawara – Tachikawa
 25 March 1930: Shitte – Hama-Kawasaki

Passenger trains utilised electric multiple units (EMUs) from the beginning. Freight initially consisted primarily of gravel hauled from the Tama River. When the railway reached Tachikawa and made connection with the Ōme Electric Railway, limestone became one of the main freight commodities. The railway was controlled by Asano zaibatsu, which enabled the transport of limestone from its own quarry in Western Tokyo to its cement plant in Kawasaki without using the government railways.

On 1 April 1944, the railway was nationalised by the imperial government and became the Nambu Line of Japanese Government Railways. After the end of World War II, there were several calls for the privatisation of the line, but the line remained a part of the Japanese National Railways (JNR) until its privatization in 1987.

The postwar growth of the Tokyo urban area resulted in the conversion of most of the farmlands along the Nambu Line into residential areas and increased the passenger traffic on the line. Freight traffic reduced after the opening of the Musashino Line (parallel to the Nambu Line) in 1976 and the discontinuance of the limestone freight in 1998, except for the Nambu Branchline, which remains a major freight route.

Limited-stop "Rapid" services between Kawasaki and Noborito with stops at Musashi-Kosugi and Musashi-Mizonokuchi started on 15 December 1969, but were discontinued by the timetable revision on 2 October 1978. After 33 years, Rapid services between Kawasaki and Tachikawa with more stops started on 9 April 2011, postponed from the originally scheduled 12 March due to the 2011 Tōhoku earthquake and tsunami.

On 20 August 2016, station numbering was introduced with Nambu line stations being assigned station numbers between JN01 and JN26. Numbers increase towards in the westbound direction towards Tachikawa. In addition, station numbers JN51 to JN54 were assigned to the branch line stations with numbers increasing in the direction of Hama-Kawasaki.

See also
 List of railway lines in Japan

References

External links

Stations of the Nambu Line (JR East) 

 
Lines of East Japan Railway Company
Railway lines in Tokyo
Railway lines in Kanagawa Prefecture
1067 mm gauge railways in Japan
Railway lines opened in 1927
1927 establishments in Japan